Jim McKeown is a retired Australian racing driver who competed in the Australian Touring Car Championship from 1964 to 1972, with a best finish of 2nd in the 1970 ATCC. McKeown was part of the successful Neptune Racing Team alongside Norm Beechey and Peter Manton. The team later became known as the Shell Racing Team and consisted of McKeown in a Porsche 911S, Beechey in a Holden Monaro GTS350 and Manton in a Morris Cooper S.

In addition to the Australian Touring Car Championship, McKeown also competed in the Bathurst 500 and its forerunner at Phillip Island on four occasions. He and George Reynolds took the Class D win at the 1962 Armstrong 500, five laps off the lead. McKeown drove for the Ford Works Team under Harry Firth in the 1968 Hardie-Ferodo 500, finishing 42nd with Spencer Martin in the team's only XT Falcon GT fitted with an automatic transmission. In the 1970s McKeown raced Porsches in the Sports Sedan category, achieving a 2nd-place finish in the 1974 Toby Lee Series at Oran Park.

Career results

Complete Australian Touring Car Championship results
(key) (Races in bold indicate pole position) (Races in italics indicate fastest lap)

References

Australian racing drivers
Australian Touring Car Championship drivers
Living people
Year of birth missing (living people)